The 2018 Magyar Kupa was the 19th edition of the tournament.

Schedule
The rounds of the 2018 competition are scheduled as follows:

Preliminary round
The preliminary round ties were scheduled for 27–28 October 2018.

Group A
Tournament was played at Bitskey Aladár uszoda, Eger.

Group B
Tournament was played at Kőér utcai uszoda, Budapest.

Quarter-finals
The quarter-final matches were played on 17 and 18 November 2018.

|}

Final four

The semi-finals were held on 14 at the Tüskecsarnok Uszoda in Budapest, XI. ker. The final was held on 16 December 2018 at the Császár-Komjádi Swimming Stadium in Budapest, II. ker.

Semi-finals

Final

Final standings

See also
2018–19 Országos Bajnokság I (National Championship of Hungary)
2018 Szuperkupa (Super Cup of Hungary)

References

External links
 Hungarian Water Polo Federaration

Seasons in Hungarian water polo competitions
Hungary
Magyar Kupa Women